Mount Gimber is an ice-covered mountain 0.5 nautical miles (0.9 km) southeast of Landfall Peak in the extreme west part of Thurston Island. It was named by the Advisory Committee on Antarctic Names (US-ACAN) after Commander H.M.S. Gimber, the captain of the destroyer Brownson  in the Eastern Group of U.S. Navy Operation Highjump, 1946–47.

See also
 Mountains in Antarctica

Maps
 Thurston Island – Jones Mountains. 1:500000 Antarctica Sketch Map. US Geological Survey, 1967.
 Antarctic Digital Database (ADD). Scale 1:250000 topographic map of Antarctica. Scientific Committee on Antarctic Research (SCAR), 1993–2016.

References

Mountains of Ellsworth Land